Welti is an unincorporated community in Cullman County, Alabama, United States. Welti was damaged during the April 2014 tornado outbreak. Welti was formerly home to the Welti Road Covered Bridge, until it was burned down on October 22, 1939. Welti Falls, a waterfall created from the spillway of Forest Ingram Lake, is located near Welti.

References

Unincorporated communities in Cullman County, Alabama
Unincorporated communities in Alabama